The K660i is a camera phone produced by Sony Ericsson released in 2008 (14 March 2008 in Norway).

External links
 Official K660i page

K660i